Podgoria is a commune in Buzău County, Muntenia, Romania. It is composed of five villages: Coțatcu, Oratia, Pleșești, Podgoria and Tăbăcari.

Notes

Communes in Buzău County
Localities in Muntenia